Giovanni Di Noia (born 3 July 1994) is an Italian footballer who plays as a midfielder for  club Foggia.

Club career
He made his professional debut in the Lega Pro for Pontedera on 8 September 2013 in a game against Paganese.

On 7 August 2018, Di Noia signed with Serie A team Chievo for free. After joined on loan to Carpi until 30 June 2019.

On 26 January 2021, he joined Perugia on loan with an obligation to buy. On 28 August 2021, he was loaned by Perugia to Fidelis Andria. On 15 January 2022, he moved on a new loan to Gubbio.

On 13 July 2022, Di Noia signed a two-year deal with Foggia.

References

External links
 
 
 

1994 births
Living people
Footballers from Bari
Italian footballers
Association football midfielders
Serie B players
Serie C players
Lega Pro Seconda Divisione players
S.S.C. Bari players
S.S. Chieti Calcio players
U.S. Città di Pontedera players
Matera Calcio players
Ternana Calcio players
A.C. Cesena players
A.C. ChievoVerona players
A.C. Carpi players
A.C. Perugia Calcio players
S.S. Fidelis Andria 1928 players
A.S. Gubbio 1910 players
Calcio Foggia 1920 players
Italy youth international footballers